The flyweight competition at the 2019 AIBA Women's World Boxing Championships was held from 3 to 13 October 2019.

Schedule
The schedule was as follows:

All times are Irkutsk Time (UTC+8)

Results

Final

Top half

Section 1

Section 2

Bottom half

Section 3

Section 4

Jury review of Nguyễn vs. Aetbaeva bout

References

External links
Draw 

Flyweight